The Automotive Racing Products Turkey Night Grand Prix is an annual race of midget cars. It is the third oldest race in the United States behind the Indianapolis 500 and the Pikes Peak International Hill Climb. It has been held on Thanksgiving night most years since 1934, where it was founded by Earl Gilmore at his Gilmore Stadium in Los Angeles. It stayed at this location until 1950. Since that time it has been held at various southern California race tracks. Since 1955, the race has been promoted by J. C. Agajanian and later his descendants, currently by son Cary. Traditionally a dirt track event, it has sometimes been on asphalt during the turn of the 21st century, although it returned to dirt in 2012. The feature race was held over 98 laps in the modern era, the same number that Agajanian used for his racecars.

The race is the traditional end of the midget and sprint car racing season in North America, although many top stars typically take a few weeks off before returning to racing in Australia or New Zealand, with the Southern Hemisphere summer leading to an "international season" that starts Boxing Day.

There was no race in 1942–44 (World War II) nor 2020 (California state pandemic restrictions). 

As the USAC Midget schedule in November has expanded with the Hangtown 100 in Placerville the week before, and the Merced County Fairgrounds meeting on the Tuesday and Wednesday of Thanksgiving week, the Turkey Night Grand Prix moved away from Thanksgiving night in 2021, instead being split across the following two days with practice on Friday, and the heat races and feature on Saturday.

Drivers
The event is considered a major event in the midget cars series. It frequently attracts drivers from other disciplines, especially former drivers that have moved to the highest levels of auto racing; the major auto racing circuits in the United States end their seasons prior to Thanksgiving, so major drivers do not have any schedule conflicts with their main circuits. Drivers that have competed in the event include Parnelli Jones, A. J. Foyt, Johnnie Parsons, Bill Vukovich, Danny Oakes, Jeff Gordon, Tony Stewart, J. J. Yeley, Jason Leffler, Kasey Kahne, and Kyle Larson.

After Kaylee Bryson qualified fastest for the 2021 event, she became the first woman to start on the pole position in the 80th event. Her Keith Kunz/Curb-Agajanian teammate Taylor Reimer qualified second, and they became the first women to start first and second in USAC National Midget history. Bryson led the first 17 laps to become the first woman to lead the event.

Locations
Several locations have hosted the race. 
Gilmore Stadium (1934–1950) (now Television City Studios)
Gardena Stadium (1955–1959)
Ascot Park (1960–1974, 1976–1990)
 Speedway 605 (1975)
Saugus Speedway (1991)
Bakersfield Speedway (1992–1995, 1998)
Perris Auto Speedway (1996, 2012–2015)
Ventura Raceway (1997, 2016–present)
Irwindale Speedway (1999–2011)

List of winners

References

Irwindale Turkey Night Grand Prix Preview; November 3, 1999; motorsport.com; Retrieved February 5, 2007; includes winners list before 1999
Turkey Night Midget Grand Prix; scrafan.com; Retrieved February 7, 2007

External links
Ventura Raceway, current location of Turkey Night Grand Prix

American open wheel series races
Motorsport competitions in California
Thanksgiving (United States)
Midget car racing